Vetelgyus is the ninth studio album by power metal/neo-classical metal band Galneryus. The track "Attitude to Life" was used as the ending theme for the anime television series Laughing Under the Clouds.

Track listing
All songs arranged by Galneryus and Yorimasa Hisatake.

Track 2 was rerecorded in Syu's 2016 solo album You Play Hard as an instrumental

Personnel
Syu - Guitar
Sho - Vocals
Taka - Bass
Junichi - Drums
Yuhki - Keyboards, Hammond organ

Additional credits
Yasuyuki "Buddy" Hirahara - (Instrumental Technician)
Hitomi Orima - (Female Vocals on Tr. 5, 7, 10)
Syu, Sho, Yuhki, Yorimasa Hisatake - (Additional Chorus)
Yutaka Kuwase (LOGGIA) - (Art Direction and Design)
Shinya Omachi - (Photographer)

Chart performance
The album reached #16 and #18 on the Billboard Japan Top Albums and Oricon album charts, respectively; the second highest rankings of their studio albums.

References

2014 albums
Galneryus albums